William Terrelle Henderson (born February 19, 1971) is a former American football fullback who played 12 seasons for the Green Bay Packers of the National Football League (NFL), with whom he won Super Bowl XXXI against the New England Patriots. He played college football for the University of North Carolina at Chapel Hill, and was chosen by the Packers in the third round of the 1995 NFL Draft.

High school and college career
Henderson attended Thomas Dale High School in Chester, Virginia.  He played varsity football as a freshman, sophomore, and junior, but sat out his senior year due to a knee injury.

At the University of North Carolina at Chapel Hill, Henderson finished his career with 145 carries for 750 yards (5.17 yards per carry avg.) and 14 receptions for 97 yards (6.93 yards per rec. avg.).

NFL
Henderson was drafted by the Green Bay Packers in 1995, and has played every season in his career with the Packers. He came into the league as number 30, but after cornerback Doug Evans left, changed his number to 33.

Henderson was durable and effective for the Packers, solidifying the team at fullback after moving into the starting role in 1996.  Nine times in his first 11 seasons he played in all 16 games.    He was selected to 2004 Pro Bowl. His consistent play, especially in his later years, had many Packer players and fans calling him "Old Reliable."

Henderson played in 188 games for the Green Bay Packers putting him in 5th place for "Most Played Games Played" in the team's history. Only Brett Favre (255) Donald Driver (205), Bart Starr (196) and Ray Nitschke (190) played in more games for the Packers. He also blocked for six of the top nine individual rushing efforts in team annals — Dorsey Levens' 1,435 yards in 1997 (third), Ahman Green's 1,883 in 2003 (first), 1,387 in 2001 (fourth), 1,240 in 2002 (sixth), 1,175 in 2000 (seventh) and 1,163 in 2004 (ninth). Henderson would be the lead blocker for a 1,000-yard running back for 9 of his 12 NFL seasons, for three different running backs: Edgar Bennett, Dorsey Levens, and Ahman Green.

Henderson was also valuable as pass catcher out of the backfield. As of 2008, he stands tenth all-time on the Packers' career receptions list with 320 (for 2,409 yards), and first among running backs. He also has 123 career rushing attempts for 426 yards.

On March 7, 2007, the Packers released Henderson amidst rumors that the Packers were trying to sign fullback Justin Griffith. GM Ted Thompson released the following statement. "We are releasing William at this point so he can pursue other opportunities within the National Football League," GM Ted Thompson said. "The Packers organization is extremely appreciative of his efforts over the past 12 seasons. His leadership and work ethic set an excellent example for everyone in our locker room. It is difficult to part with a high-character individual like William. He has been an influential person on several outstanding Packers teams over his career. He always will be considered a Packer."

NFL statistics
Rushing Stats 

Receiving Stats

Returning Stats

Broadcasting
Henderson has eight years (1999–2006) of broadcasting experience as co-host of Monday Night Kickoff, a show produced by Green Bay TV station WBAY.  He also worked as an analyst as part of ESPN's NFL Draft coverage April 2006.

Henderson resides in Richmond, Virginia.  He was selected as Green Bay's 2001 'Unsung Hero,' in recognition of his efforts both on the field and in the community.

External links

 extended biography

References

1971 births
American football fullbacks
Green Bay Packers players
Living people
National Conference Pro Bowl players
North Carolina Tar Heels football players